Mark Anthony Graham Brantley (born 11 January 1969) is the Premier of Nevis, Leader of the Opposition in the National Assembly and former Minister of Foreign Affairs for St Kitts and Nevis. On May 10, 2022, Dr Timothy Harris, having lost the support of the elected majority to function as Prime Minister and facing a historic Motion of No Confidence in the National Parliament, decided to dissolve the Parliament and purported to revoke the appointment of more than 50% of his former Cabinet, including the Hon Mark Brantley. Honourable Brantley previously served as the Leader of the Opposition in the National Assembly of the Federation of St. Kitts and Nevis (2007 – 2015).  He is married and has 2 daughters. Brantley read law at the University of the West Indies, obtained his Legal Education Certificate of Merit from Norman Manley Law School in Jamaica and also holds a Bachelor of Civil Law from the University of Oxford, St. Catherine College. Prior to entering politics, Brantley worked as an attorney.

Career

Legal career
Brantley is a lawyer by profession and has acted in several notable cases involving international litigation. He attended secondary school at Charlestown Secondary School. He completed his higher education at the University of the West Indies where he graduated with a Bachelor of Laws, Upper Second Class Honors. He then attended the Norman Manley Law School where he received a Legal Education Certificate of Merit. He completed his studies at St Catherine's College, a college of the University of Oxford in the United Kingdom (which he attended as a Commonwealth Scholar) where he completed a Bachelor of Civil Law. Brantley has been admitted to the bar in St Kitts and Nevis, Anguilla, Grenada, Antigua and Barbuda and Dominica.

Political career
Brantley serves as a member of the National Assembly, representing the conservative, Nevis-based Concerned Citizens' Movement. He serves as the Minister of Foreign Affairs in the St. Christopher and Nevis Federal Government. He was formerly the Deputy Premier of the Nevis Island Administration and held the portfolio of Minister of Tourism, Health, Culture, Youth, Sports, and Community Development in that government. From 2007-2015 he served as the Leader of the Opposition in the National Assembly. He hosts a weekly two hour political talk-show on VON Radio 860AM.

On 29 October 2017, Nevis Premier and Leader of the CCM Vance Amory stepped down, with Brantley winning the leadership roles at the CCM party convention. On 18 December 2017 his party won the election, allowing him to retain his role as the Premier of Nevis.

He led his party to victory in the 2017 Nevis Island Assembly election, with the CCM winning 4 of the 5 seats. He currently serves as the Premier of Nevis with a number of ministry roles on the Nevis Island Administration.

He was appointed as Leader of the Opposition in the National Assembly on 10 October 2022.

Personal life
Brantley is married with two daughters.

See also
List of foreign ministers in 2017
List of current foreign ministers

References

Living people
1969 births
Premiers of Nevis
Alumni of St Catherine's College, Oxford
Concerned Citizens' Movement politicians
Government ministers of Saint Kitts and Nevis
Members of the National Assembly (Saint Kitts and Nevis)
University of the West Indies alumni
People from Saint George Gingerland Parish
Foreign Ministers of Saint Kitts and Nevis